Frederick J. Murray (c. 1892 – July 30, 1954) was an American football player, coach, and official and coach of baseball, basketball, and track and field. He served as the head football coach at Rhode Island State College, now the University of Rhode Island, in 1919, compiling a record of 0–7–1. Murray was also Rhode Island State's head basketball coach for one season in 1919–20, tallying a mark of 3–8.

Murray graduated from the Boston Latin School in 1911 and attended Georgetown University, where he played college football and was captain of the 1914 Georgetown Blue and Gray football team. He began coaching in 1916 at Gloucester High School in Gloucester, Massachusetts. After coaching football and baseball at Gloucester for two years, he served in the United States Army as an aviator during World War I. In 1920, Murray was hired to coach at The English High School in Boston. In 1936, he was hired to coach at Boston's Roslindale High School.

Murray also worked as a college football official. He officiated the 1941 Sugar Bowl in New Orleans, won by Boston College. He died on July 30, 1952, at Carney Hospital in Boston, following a three-week illness.

Head coaching record

College football

References

Year of birth uncertain
1890s births
1954 deaths
American football halfbacks
College football officials
Georgetown Hoyas football players
Rhode Island Rams baseball coaches
Rhode Island Rams football coaches
Rhode Island Rams men's basketball coaches
College men's basketball head coaches in the United States
High school football coaches in Massachusetts
Boston Latin School alumni
American World War I pilots
Sportspeople from Boston
Coaches of American football from Massachusetts
Players of American football from Boston